The cuisine of Paraguay is the set of dishes and culinary techniques of Paraguay. It has a marked influence of the Guaraní people, in fusion with the Spanish cuisine and other marked influences coming from the immigration received by bordering countries such as Italian cuisine and Portuguese food. The gastronomy product of the syncretism and Hispanic-Guaraní fusion, is of greater weight in the Paraguayan history and considered the mother of the whole region, having Asunción as the starting point of many Spanish expeditions in the Southern Cone. It is worth clarifying that in society Paraguayan, the exchange of knowledge occurred between mestizos, criollos and guaraníes, before and even after the Jesuit missions. In 2017, the Ministry of the National Secretariat of Culture of Paraguay decided:"Declare as  'Intangible Cultural Heritage of Paraguay'  the production, handcrafted and traditional production of four typical Paraguayan meals still in force such as vori-vori, locro, Paraguayan soup and jopara (mixed bean and locro) and its recipes, knowledge, practices and knowledge that are passed down from generation to generation and document the material and immaterial elements associated with it (such as corn, in its different varieties) as a cultural manifestation. "

Pre-Columbian period 

There are references dating back to 1567 from a German chronicler and military man Ulrico Schmidl, who published in Baviera his experiences in Paraguay and the Río de la Plata, whose testimonies coincide with other chroniclers on the anthropophagic customs of many Native Americans, involving the Guaraní, Carios, Caribes, Mexicas, Araucanos, Incas, etc. According to chef and gastronomic historian Vidal Domínguez Díaz, the gastronomic wealth of the Carios along with the gastronomic wealth of the Spaniards resulted in Paraguayan food. The most prominent example is the Cario gastronomic technique, in which wild meat on the stake is replaced by beef. The Paraguayan Sunday or festive preference for roast meats stems from the seven cows and a bull that arrived in Asunción.

The Guarani had a diet based on wild animals and corn bread, starch with animal fat, but they were totally unaware of the use of milk, beef, cheese and eggs. Although the Guaraní and Carios inhabited a large part of the American soil, the first Spanish-Guaraní syncretism occurred in 1537 with the founding of Asunción when the contact with the Carios, in which a short time later the cattle are introduced into that area. For this reason, Asunción is considered the mother of the Río de la Plata gastronomy, since the expedition that would found the city of Buenos Aires (and some of the Argentine coast), made up of Spaniards, 66 Paraguayan young men (among them , the only woman) and 1,500 Guaraníes. That same expedition brought cattle to populate the Pampas region.

Vicereine period 
It is considered wrong to label Paraguayan gastronomy as Guarani Gastronomy. The gastronomy of Paraguay is born from the fusion of Spanish culinary tradition and the Cairo-Guarani culinary tradition, that developed through influences of the Franciscan age, the Spanish and the criollos Asunceños (of Asuncion), whose influence took place in Asunción and its surrounding areas. Towns like Tobatí, Altos, Areguá, Ypané, Guarambaré, Itá and Yaguarón are current examples of how the Paraguayan culture developed far outside and away from the mercantile influence of the Jesuits. When the Jesuits were expelled from the area in 1767, the natives return to their natural habitat (the missionary jungle), they were no longer around their influence of education and teaching, proof of that is the extinction of Jesuit ceramics, as opposed to the Franciscan ceramics that still lives in Itá, Areguá, and Tobatí.

The cooking based from the Cairo-Guaraní life consists of game, fish, grain cultivation, their techniques and methods of cooking from the utensils they developed. The first records of true Cairo-Guaraní Spanish took place during the age of the foundation of Asunción and its surroundings, where they subsequently founded the cutback of Franciscans of Altos, Atyrá, Guarambaré, Itá, etc. In the Government of Paraguay they circumscribed the Catholic jurisdiction called the Paraguaria Province. This province, then dependent on the Viceroyalty of Peru, covering the regions of Paraguay, Argentina, Uruguay and partes of Bolivia, Brazil and Chile (between 1604 and 1617). From 1617, the Paraguaria Province was broken up from the government of the Río de la Plata and the government of Paraguay, staying in the jurisdiction of the latter. After, this region belonged to the ephemeral Viceroyalty of the Río de la Plata (1776–1810). The culture that developed in the Grand Paraguay was very strong, now that the Guaraní were used by the conquistadors and the evangelizers as intermediaries with other Native Americans. For such motives, the Paraguayan culture that characterizes Asunción firmly conserved itself in the region, and at in turn extended toward zones where later the cattle was introduced, with the foundation of Corrientes in 1588, the oldest city in the Argentine Northeast.

In the binnacles (of travelers like the German Ulrico Schmidl) and in the historical registry of the Vicereine age, it appears in various paragraphs that the Carios-Guaraní (tribe that inhabited the zone of Asuncion) prepared cakes and breads from bases of Cassava, Corn and sweet corn mixed with animal grease, known as mbuyapé (bread in Guaraní). The Cario-Guaraní food was complemented with Criolle food provided to the Spanish from the old continent. To this it is owed the introduction of the cattle in 1556, and after these were obtained, new dishes like: Beef and sheep meat, milk, eggs, cheese, etc. In this way, the foods with ingredients from the Cario-Guaraní food base (corn, Cassava, pumpkin, sweet potato, etc.) the mixed with traded ingredients from the Spanish (Meat, milk, eggs, cheeses, etc.). This union gave way to foods that have been consumed since the Vicereine age until present day. It was in this context where the recipes of the typical foods of Paraguay that have ingredients containing cassava, corn, cheese, milk and cattle originated.

Republican period 
In this period the mestiza kitchen, as its known, is solidified, a product of the fusion of the knowledge and elements of the Guarani with the trades made with the conquistadors, like the updating of utensils and forms of cooking the food. Evolving in the age of the Lopez with the knowledge of the mestiza kitchen and capitalizing on all the country produced, as well as new recipes of fruit and the novelty in the age of Carlos Antonio López and later with Francisco Solano López and Madame Lynch. During this period and in the post-war years, it is noted how they took advantage of their products. Countless recipes have been found where they reuse meets in a variety of formulas. The use of the cassava and the corn when serving the food was very common.

From 1537 until 1870, the European immigracion was slow, above all in the independent era due to the late international opening-up during the mandate of Dr. Francia. More recently, during the government of Carlos Antonio López, the countries of the region and of Europe finally recognized the independence of Paraguay, similar to France and Argentina. The European political migration comes into play after the Paraguayan War, a phenomenon that transformed and makes up the current society of Paraguay. In this way, the gastronomy begins to inherit traded elements of the immigrants that began arriving in Paraguay at the end of the 1800s and the beginning fourth of the 1900s, setting the bases for the modern kitchen, with processed ingredients in Paraguay and adapted to the way of life in the 21st century. The principal influences the enriched the Paraguayan culinary art are from the Italians and the Germans, in respect to the consumption of pastas, desserts, drinks and cold cuts, now rooted in Paraguay.

The gastronomy of Paraguay has common American elements like the use of corn, cassava, peanuts and beans. The inheritance of natural resources, the culture of the Guarani and the mix with the European culture, gives Paraguay a unique gastronomy compared to the rest of America, keeping more similarities with countries of the River Plate Region. Elements like chipa and tereré, are spread throughout all of the Southern Cone of South America thanks to internal migrations. In 2017 the Ministry of the National Secretary of Culture in Paraguay decided:“To declare as Immaterial Cultural Heritage of Paraguay to the production, artisan elaboration and traditional of the four typical Paraguayan foods currently validated as the Vori-Vori, the Locro, the Sopa Paraguaya, and the Yopará (a mix of the Poroto and the Locro); as well as their recipes, knowledge, practices and flavors transmitted from generation to generation and it is documented the material and immaterial elements associated to them (corn, in its different varieties) as a cultural declaration.”

Ingredients 
Meat, vegetables, manioc, maize, and fruits are common in Paraguayan cuisine. Barbecuing is both a cooking technique and often a social event, and are known as the Asado. Many dishes are based on corn, milk, cheese and meat, and fish caught in rivers are also eaten. There are about 70 varieties of chipa (cake) in Paraguay. Most chipas are made from manioc flour, which is derived from cassava, and cornmeal.

Common dishes 

Dumplings.
 Chipa is a bread made with manioc, egg and cheese.
In Argentina known as chipá and in Bolivia as cuñapé.
 Chipa guasu is a cake made with corn grains, and is an original and common food of Paraguay. It is often served at the asado.
 Chipa so'o is another type of cake.
 A traditional kiveve is made using pumpkin or "andai", water, salt, oil, onion (chopped into very small pieces), milk, sugar, corn flour and fresh cheese.
 Lampreado, better known as Payaguá Mascada, is a fried cake made from manioc flour.
 Mazamorra is a cooked corn mush dish.
 Mbaipy-so-ó is a corn pudding with meat.
 Mbejú is a starch cake and staple food of the Paraguayan diet.
 Milanesa, is a breaded meat cutlet, fried, baked or sauteed.
 Authentic Paraguay cheese
 Parrillada is a dish of meat cooked over hot banana leaves and coals.
 Pira caldo is a fish soup that is part of the traditional cuisine.
 Sopa paraguaya is a traditional Paraguayan dish. Literally meaning "Paraguayan soup," sopa paraguaya is similar to corn bread. Corn flour, pig fat (lard) or butter, cheese and milk or whey are common ingredients. It is a spongy cake that is rich in calories and protein content, and is the national dish of Paraguay.Though it is native to Paraguay, this dish can be found in other Spanish-speaking countries.
 Soyo is a thick soup of meat crushed in a mortar, seasoned with several spices and vegetables.
 Vori vori is a thick, yellow soup with little balls made of cornmeal, corn flour, and cheese.

Desserts 
 Cake of many different varieties.
 Kosereva is a common "barreled" candy that is native to Paraguay, with the hardened skin of the sour orange ("apepú", in Guaraní language), cooked in black molasses, resulting in a bittersweet and acid taste and having a high protein content.
 Mbaipy-he-é is a dessert dish made with milk, molasses and corn.
 Dulce de leche, literally translated, means "candy [made] of milk" or "sweet [made] of milk." It is used to fill cakes, spread over toasted bread for breakfast or any other type of bakery goods. Specially good with kokitos or buttered mosquitos. Often paired with bowls of flour.

Beverages 
Tereré is the national drink of Paraguay. Fruit juices and soft drinks are common. Beer and wine are also widely available; Pilsen is one of the most popular brands of beer. Caña is an alcoholic beverage made from sugarcane juice, and mosto is a non-alcoholic variety.

Cocido is hot tea made out of yerba mate and sugar cooked on a pan with burning coal. The elements are then filtered with hot water and can be taken alone or with milk. The color of cocido is dark brown similar to black coffee and is usually enjoyed with chipa or mbejú.

See also 
 Argentine cuisine
 Bolivian cuisine
 Uruguayan cuisine
 Cuisine of Asunción

References

External links 
 Sopa-Paraguaya (recipe). 

 
South American cuisine
Latin American cuisine